Wang Chuhan (born 24 February 1992 in Dalian) is a Chinese male tennis player.  

As a junior, Wang peaked at a career high of world No. 24. He played in the junior Australian and French Open but did not perform significantly. 

Wang represents his native country China in Davis Cup matches and has a record of 0– in singles matches. 1 

Wang has a career high ATP singles ranking of 377 achieved on 9 February 2015. He received a wildcard entry into the main draw of the 2014 Shanghai Rolex Masters, where he made his ATP Tour match debut and made the most of it. In the first round, he defeated the 15th seed Fabio Fognini of Italy  7–6(7–5(6–4 which was a huge upset. He fell in the second round to Tunisia's Malek Jaziri in straight sets 0–6, 4–6.

ATP Challenger and ITF Futures finals

Singles: 5 (2–3)

Doubles: 4 (2–2)

External links

1992 births
Living people
Chinese male tennis players
Sportspeople from Dalian
Tennis players from Liaoning
Tennis players at the 2014 Asian Games
Tennis players at the 2010 Summer Youth Olympics
Asian Games competitors for China
21st-century Chinese people